MV Malaspina Sky is an Intermediate-class ferry in the BC Ferries fleet built in 2008.

Originally named Island Sky, the ship has operated on the Earl's Cove–Saltery Bay route since its first day of service for BC Ferries on February 19, 2009. However, it was used on the Powell River (Westview) - Little River (Comox) run as the replacement vessel for Queen of Burnaby while Queen of Burnaby was being refitted, and during the upgrades to both those terminals (October 2013 to March 2014). And the vessel was temporarily assigned to the Horseshoe Bay to Langdale route (March/April 2017), whilst the dock at Langdale was being upgraded.

The ship was renamed Malaspina Sky in a ceremony on October 24, 2019. The ship was renamed as part of a BC Ferries' initiative to standardize its naming conventions, to release the name, and to prevent confusion with the upcoming Island-class ferries being delivered in 2020.

Design and construction

The passenger section of this ship was built at the Washington Marine Group (WMG) shipyards in Esquimalt, British Columbia, while the engines and hull were assembled at WMG's North Vancouver facility. The ship was built between 2006 and 2009, and was delivered almost ten months later than contracted. Despite some problems delaying her transfer to BC Ferries, she has provided effective and reliable service to date. The contract was fixed price, with penalties for delays, but BC Ferries was not fiscally responsible for any overruns. On December 10, 2008, BC Ferries formally accepted the vessel.

Incidents

Once in 2012 the ship lost power before docking, but power was restored quickly and docking was completed successfully.

References

External links 
 
 
 

I-class ferries
2008 ships
Ships built in British Columbia